The Chronicon Salernitanum, or "Salerno Chronicle", is an anonymous 10th century chronicle of the history of the Principality of Salerno. It was probably written around 990 (or 974) and has been attributed to Radoald of Salerno, Abbot of San Benedetto, by Huguette Taviani-Carozzi. It "has some claims to literary merit" and the "matter is good despite the lack of critical ability which disfigures the work," according to the Catholic Encyclopedia.

Notes

External links
Chronicon Salernitanum, from Ulla Westerbergh (ed.), Chronicon Salernitanum: A Critical Edition with Studies on Literary and Historical Sources and on Language, Acta Universitatis Stockholmiensis, Studia Latina Stockholmiensia 3 (Stockholm, 1956).
Chronicon Salernitanum at Institut für Mittelalter Forschung

Italian chronicles
10th-century history books
10th-century Latin books
Duchy of Benevento
Principality of Salerno
10th-century Italian historians
10th-century Latin writers